Sagra buqueti is a species of beetle belonging to the family Chrysomelidae.

Description
These iridescent, colorful beetles have a striking sexual dimorphism. The males are much larger and have very long and strong hind legs (hence the common name frog beetle). The basic color is metallic green, with reddish and golden reflections on the elytra. Cocoons of this species can be found in the jungle on climbing vines, specifically kudzu. They have also been captive reared at the Berlin Zoo on sweet potato.

Distribution
This species can be found in Thailand, Vietnam, Indonesia and Malaysia.

References

 Biolib
 Zipcodezoo

External links
 Male of Sagra buqueti on Flickr
 Female of Sagra buqueti on Flickr

Chrysomelidae
Beetles described in 1831
Taxa named by René Lesson